John Roland Craven (15 May 1947 – 14 December 1996) was an English professional footballer. He began his playing career as a defender, but also played as a centre-forward on occasion. He also played in the United States and captained the Vancouver Whitecaps, including in their Soccer Bowl '79 winning year. The side were inducted into the Canadian Soccer Hall of Fame and Museum as a Team of Distinction in 2011.

Death
Craven died of a heart attack while in Orange, California, in December 1996.

References

External links

1947 births
1996 deaths
Blackpool F.C. players
California Surf players
Coventry City F.C. players
Crystal Palace F.C. players
English expatriate footballers
English expatriate sportspeople in Canada
English expatriate sportspeople in the United States
English footballers
Expatriate soccer players in Canada
Expatriate soccer players in the United States
North American Soccer League (1968–1984) players
People from Lytham St Annes
Plymouth Argyle F.C. players
Vancouver Whitecaps (1974–1984) players
Association football midfielders